Copaeodes aurantiaca, the orange skipperling, is a species of grass skipper in the butterfly family Hesperiidae. It is found in Central America and North America.

The MONA or Hodges number for Copaeodes aurantiaca is 4009.

References

Further reading

 

Hesperiinae
Articles created by Qbugbot
Butterflies described in 1868
Butterflies of North America
Butterflies of Central America
Taxa named by William Chapman Hewitson